The 1931 Cuba census was the twelfth national population census held in the Republic of Cuba. The day used for the census was 21 September 1931. The census revealed a total population of 3,962,344, - an overall increase of 1,073,340 people, and an average increase of 2.61% per year over the 1919 census figure.

Population
Population count by Cuban province:

Birthplace
The number of people living in Cuba who were foreign-born continued to climb in absolute numbers but slightly declined by percentage from the previous census. In 1931, 436,897 people (11.0 percent) were born outside of Cuba.

Race

See also
Demographics of Cuba
Population and housing censuses by country

References

Cuba
1931 in Cuba
Censuses in Cuba